Jelisaveta Načić (31 December 1878 in Belgrade – 6 June 1955 in Dubrovnik) was a notable Serbian architect. She is remembered as a pioneer who inspired women to enter professions which had earlier been reserved for men. Not only the first female graduate in architecture in Belgrade, she was also the first female architect in Serbia.

Biography

Born in Belgrade, Načić matriculated from school with excellent results in 1896. She went on to study architecture at the University of Belgrade's School of Architecture at a time when it was felt that women should not enter the profession. At the age of 22, she was the first woman to graduate from the Faculty of Engineering. She sought employment at the Ministry of Construction but was unable to become an official as there was a requirement for military service to have been completed. She did however succeed in gaining a position as an architect with the Municipality of Belgrade where she became the city's first chief architect. In 1903, she designed the Little Staircase in Belgrade's Kalemegdan Park. Her most notable work is the well proportioned school building she completed in 1906, now known as the Kralj Petar I (King Peter I) elementary school. She also designed churches including the Moravian-styled Alexander Nevsky Church (1929) in Belgrade and a smaller church in Kosovo. The hospital she designed was destroyed during the Second World War but many of her residential buildings from apartments to distinctive private homes, some with art nouveau or Neo-Renaissance elements, still stand today. The first collective housing building for workers on Balkan was designed by Jelisaveta Načić.

During the World War I, she was interned in a camp in Hungary, bringing her artistic career to an end. It had lasted no more than 16 years. After the war, Načić moved to Dubrovnik with her husband Luka Lukai whom she had met in the camp. She was awarded a state pension for her life accomplishments. She died in Dubrovnik in 1955.

See also
Women in architecture
Jovanka Bončić-Katerinić

References

Serbian architects
University of Belgrade Faculty of Architecture alumni
1878 births
1955 deaths
Art Nouveau architects
Serbian women architects